is a Japanese kickboxer and muay thai fighter, currently competing in the featherweight division of RISE. He is the former KNOCKOUT RED and WBC Muaythai Japan Featherweight champion.

A professional competitor since 2016, he is the former REBELS two-weight champion and the WPMF World featherweight champion. Prior to making his professional debut, Yasumoto had a lengthy six-year amateur career, during which he captured a grand total of 24 championships.

Martial arts career

Super flyweight career

Early career
Yasumoto made his professional debut against Kim Seung Min at REBELS.43 on June 1, 2016. He won the fight by a first-round spinning back fist knockout.

Yasumoto was scheduled to face Taiga Nakayama at Kunlun Fight 49 / Rebels 45 on August 7, 2016. He won the fight by unanimous decision, with scores of 30–28, 30–27 and 30–26.

Yasumoto made his first appearance with Japan Kickboxing Innovation on October 9, 2016, when he was scheduled to fight Ryuta. He won the fight by unanimous decision, with scores of 30–28, 30–28 and 29–28.

Yasumoto was scheduled to face Takuya Hasunuma in a REBELS and Innovation cross-promotional event on January 22, 2017. He dominated every round of the bout, with two judges awarding him a 30-27 scorecard, while the third judge scored the fight as 30-25 in his favor.

Yasumoto was scheduled to face Kazuya Okuwaki at REBELS.49 on March 11, 2017. He won the fight by unanimous decision, with scores of 29–28, 30–27 and 30–27.

REBELS Super Flyweight champion
Yasumoto challenged Kiminori Matsuzaki for the REBELS Red Super Flyweight title at REBELS.51 on June 11, 2016, at just 16 years of age. His 41 year old opponent was making his first title defense. The difference in experience was likewise notable, as Matsuzaki was a 39–fight veteran, while Yasumoto was making only his sixth professional appearance. Yasumoto won the fight by a unanimous decision, with scores of 49–47, 49–47 and 49–46, spending the majority of the bout pressuring and attempting to overwhelm Matsuzaki. Matsuzaki's sole moment of success was a left elbow in the third round, which resulted in a doctor check due to a cut before Yasumoto was allowed to continue fighting.

For the first fight of his title reign, Yasumoto was scheduled to face Yuya Kosaka in a non-title bout at ROAD TO KNOCK OUT.2 on July 20, 2017. The evenly contested fight was ruled a draw by unanimous decision, with all three judges scoring the bout 29–29.

Super bantamweight career

Move up in weight
Yasumoto was scheduled to face the #4 ranked RISE bantamweight Yugo Flyskygym at RISE 119 on September 15, 2017. The fight was contested at 55 kg, which was a 3 kg increase from Yasumoto's previous bouts. He won the fight by a second-round technical knockout due to repeted body shots which forced the referee to stop the fight. The knockout was preceded by a right hook which resulted in a knockdown.

Yasumoto moved back down to 53 kg for his next fight, against Lampoochai Kaewsamrit at Japan Kickboxing Innovation on October 18, 2017. He won the fight by unanimous decision, with scores of 30–28, 30–29 and 30–29.

Yasumoto was scheduled to fight Takahiro Sakuragi at Japan Kickboxing Innovation Champions Carnival 2017 on December 17, 2017. The fight was contested at 57 kg, the heaviest that Yasumoto weighed in at so far in his career. He won the fight by unanimous decision, with all three judges scoring the bout as 30–29.

Yasumoto remained at 57 kg for his next fight, against Yuudai Hamamoto at REBELS.55 on April 27, 2018. He notched his second ever stoppage victory, winning by a second-round technical knockout. The first knockdown was scored with a head kick, while the remaining two were scored with a left straight.

Yasumoto remained at 57 kg from that point on. He was next scheduled to face Dawsakorn Mor.Tasanai at REBELS.57 on August 3, 2018. The fight was ruled a majority draw after the first three rounds, with one judge scoring it for Dawsakorn, while the remaining two scored it as an even 29–29 draw. The judges were split in the same manner after an extra round was fought.

Innovation Super Bantamweight champion
Yasumoto fought Kazuto for the Innovation Super Bantamweight title at Japan Kickboxing Innovation on December 16, 2018. He won the fight by a third-round knockout. During the first minute of the round, Yasumoto landed a body shot which crumpled Kazuto. Kazuto was able to beat the eight-count, but quickly succumbed to a second body shot.

Yasumoto was scheduled to face the Shootboxing SB Japan Super Bantamweight champion Seiki Ueyama at SHOOT BOXING 2019 act.1 on February 11, 2019 in a non-title bout. Ueyama won the fight by majority decision, with scores of 30–27, 29–29 and 29–28, handing Yasumoto his first professional loss. The most significant moment of the bout came in the third round when Ueyama managed to catch Yasumoto in a standing front choke. Although he wasn't able to finish it, Ueyama was awarded a catch point for an effective attack.

Yasumoto was scheduled to face Hannya Hashimoto in his return to REBELS at REBELS.60 on April 20, 2019. The fight was contested at 59 kg, which was yet another increase in weight for Yasumoto. He dominated every round of the bout, winning by unanimous decision, with scores of 30–26, 30–26 and 30–25.

Featherweight career

REBELS Featherweight champion
Yasumoto was scheduled to face Shogo Kuriaki at REBELS.61 on June 9, 2019, for the REBELS Featherweight title. He won the fight by unanimous decision, with scores of 49–47, 49–47 and 49–46. Kuriaki had the most success during the third round, during which he caused a cut on Yasumoto which required a doctor check.

Yasumoto was scheduled to fight Shunta at K.O CLIMAX 2019 SUMMER KICK FEVER on August 18, 2019. He won the fight by a fifth-round knockout.

Yasumoto was scheduled to face Arato at KNOCK OUT × REBELS on October 4, 2019. He won the fight by a first-round technical knockout.

Yasumoto fought Plem TC.MuayThai for the WPMF World Featherweight title at JAPAN KICKBOXING INNOVATION on November 17, 2019. He won the fight by a first-round knockout.

Yasumoto was scheduled to fight Daosayam Nor.Naksin at the inaugural KNOCK OUT CHAMPIONSHIP event on February 11, 2020. He won the fight by split decisoon, with scores of 29–28, 28–29 and 30–29.

Yasumoto appeared at the second KNOCK OUT CHAMPIONSHIP event as well, being scheduled to face Visanlek Meibukai on September 12, 2020. He won the fight by a second-round technical knockout.

Yasumoto made his last appearance with REBELS, before its merger with KNOCKOUT, against BEN Samurai Y'ZD at REBELS 67 on November 8, 2020. He won the fight by a second-round spinning back kick knockout.

KNOCKOUT RED Featherweight champion
Following the REBELS and KNOCKOUT merger, Yasumoto was announced as the KNOCKOUT RED champion. His first appearance as the KNOCKOUT champion was a non-title bout against Phetsila FurumuraGym at KNOCK OUT ～The REBORN～ on March 13, 2021. He won the fight by a second-round knockout.

Yasumoto was scheduled to face Kenichi Takeuchi at KNOCK OUT 2021 vol.3 on July 18, 2021. He won the fight by a third-round knockout, landing a head kick at the 0:30 minute mark.

Yasumoto was scheduled to face Ryuto Matsumoto for the WBC Muay Thai Japan Featherweight title at NJKF 2021 3rd on September 19, 2021. He won the fight by a third-round technical knockout.

Yasumoto faced Taisei Kakuda at KNOCK OUT 2021 vol.6 on November 28, 2021. He won the fight by unanimous decision, with scores of 29-25, 29-26 and 29-27.

On February 8, 2022, it was announced that Yasumoto would fight at Chakuriki 15 on April 27, 2022, against former MAX Muay Thai champion Yodprapsuek Sor Ninthai. He won the fight by a first-round technical knockout. Yasmuoto knocked Yodprapsuek twice before the stoppage, first time with a right straight and the second time with a flurry of strikes.

Yasumoto was scheduled to face veteran Yosuke Morii at NO KICK NO LIFE on May 28, 2022. This would mark his debut above the 60 kg limit. He won the fight by a third-round knockout.

RISE
On June 19, 2022, it was announced that Yasumoto had signed with RISE. On July 28, three weeks after he had signed with RISE, it was announced that Yasumoto had vacated the KNOCKOUT RED featherweight title. He made his promotional return against Mehrdad Sayyadi at RISE 160 on July 29, 2022. Yasumoto won the fight by a first-round knockout. The bout was later reviewed and changed to a no contest, as Sayyadi was stopped with an elbow, which is an illegal strike under the RISE rule-set.

Yasumoto faced the sixth-ranked RISE featherweight Kensei Yamakawa at RISE Word Series 2022 on October 15, 2022. He needed just 64 seconds to stop Yamakawa.

Yasumoto faced the two-weight Shootboxing champion Kyo Kawakami, in a Shootboxing rules bout, at RISE WORLD SERIES / SHOOTBOXING-KINGS on December 25, 2022. Although Yasumoto was able to fight to a draw following the first three rounds, he lost the fight by majority decision after the extra fourth round was contested.

Yasumoto faced the 2022 K-1 Featherweight World Grand Prix Tournament Runner-up Toma Tanabe at K-1 World GP 2023: K'Festa 6 on March 12, 2023. He won the fight by unanimous decision, with scores of 30-29, 30-28 and 29-28.

Championships and accomplishments

Amateur
M-1
2010 M-1 -25 kg Champion
2014 M-ONE WPMF -45 kg Champion
Windy Super Fight
2010 Windy Super Fight -25 kg Champion
2012 Windy Super Fight -30 kg Champion
2013 Windy Super Fight -35 kg Champion
2014 Windy Super Fight -40 kg Champion
Martial Arts Japan Kickboxing Federation
2011 MA Kick Jr -28 kg Champion
2012 MA Kick Jr -32 kg Champion
2013 MA Kick Jr -32 kg Champion
New Japanese Kickboxing Federation
2012 NJKF -30 kg Champion
2013 NJKF -35 kg Champion
All Japan Jr. Kick
2012 All Japan Jr. Kick -30 kg Champion
2014 All Japan Jr. Kick -40 kg Champion
2015 All Japan Jr. Kick -45 kg Champion
REBELS
2014 REBELS Blow Cup -40 kg Winner
Battle of Muay Thai
2014 Battle of Muay Thai -40 kg Champion
Muaythai Open
2014 MuayThaiOpen -45 kg Champion
INNOVATION
2015 SMASHERS -50 kg Champion and Best Fighter Award
WBC Muaythai
2015 WBC Muay Thai All Japan Jr League -50 kg Champion

Professional
REBELS
 2017 REBELS Red Super Flyweight Championship
 2019 REBELS Red Featherweight Championship
Japan Kickboxing Innovation
 2018 Innovation Super Bantamweight Championship
World Professional Muaythai Federation
 2019 WPMF World Featherweight Championship
KNOCK OUT
 2021 KNOCK OUT Red Featherweight ChampionshipWorld Boxing Council Muaythai 2021 WBC Muay Thai Japan Featherweight Championship

Fight record

|- style="background:#cfc;"
| 2023-03-12 || Win||align=left| Toma || K-1 World GP 2023: K'Festa 6 || Tokyo, Japan ||  Decision (Unanimous) || 3 ||3:00 
|-  style="text-align:center; background:#fbb"
| 2022-12-25|| Loss ||align=left| Kyo Kawakami || RISE WORLD SERIES / SHOOTBOXING-KINGS|| Tokyo, Japan || Ext.R Decision (Majority) || 4 || 3:00
|-  style="text-align:center; background:#cfc"
| 2022-10-15|| Win ||align=left| Kensei Yamakawa || RISE Word Series 2022|| Tokyo, Japan || KO (High kick) || 1 || 1:05

|-  style="text-align:center; background:#c5d2ea"
| 2022-07-29|| NC||align=left| Mehrdad Sayyadi || RISE 160 || Tokyo, Japan || No Contest (Illegal elbow) || 1 || 2:22
|-
! style=background:white colspan=9 |

|-  style="text-align:center; background:#cfc"
| 2022-05-28|| Win||align=left| Yosuke Morii || NO KICK NO LIFE || Tokyo, Japan || KO (Punches) || 3||2:18
|-  style="text-align:center; background:#cfc;"
| 2022-04-27|| Win ||align=left| Yodprapsuek Sor Ninthai || Chakuriki 15 Fujiwara Festival || Tokyo, Japan || TKO (Referee stopapge) || 1 || 1:07
|-  style="text-align:center; background:#cfc;"
| 2021-11-28|| Win ||align=left| Taisei Kakuda || KNOCK OUT 2021 vol.6  || Tokyo, Japan || Decision (Unanimous) || 3||3:00
|- style="background:#cfc;"
| 2021-09-19|| Win || align="left" | Ryuto Matsumoto || NJKF 2021 3rd ||Tokyo, Japan|| TKO (Elbow) || 3 || 0:46
|-
! style=background:white colspan=9 |

|-  style="background:#cfc;"
| 2021-07-18|| Win ||align=left| Kenichi Takeuchi || KNOCK OUT 2021 vol.3 || Tokyo, Japan || KO (High Kick)  || 3 || 0:30
|-  style="background:#cfc;"
| 2021-03-13|| Win ||align=left| Phetsila FurumuraGym || KNOCK OUT ～The REBORN～ || Tokyo, Japan || KO (Spinning back kick to the body)  || 2 || 1:18
|-  style="background:#cfc;"
| 2020-11-08|| Win ||align=left| BEN Samurai Y'ZD|| REBELS 67 || Tokyo, Japan || KO (Spinning back kick)|| 2|| 2:38
|-  style="background:#cfc;"
| 2020-09-12|| Win ||align=left| Visanlek Meibukai || KNOCK OUT CHAMPIONSHIP.2 || Tokyo, Japan || TKO (Doctor Stoppage) || 2|| 1:12
|-  style="background:#cfc;"
| 2020-02-11|| Win ||align=left| Daosayam Nor.Naksin || KNOCK OUT CHAMPIONSHIP.1 || Tokyo, Japan || Decision (Split) || 3|| 3:00
|- style="background:#CCFFCC;"
| 2019-11-17|| Win || align="left" | Plem TC.MuayThai ||JAPAN KICKBOXING INNOVATION ||Okayama, Japan|| KO (Punches)|| 1 || 2:00 
|-
! style=background:white colspan=9 |
|- style="background:#CCFFCC;"
| 2019-10-04|| Win || align="left" | Arato ||KNOCK OUT × REBELS ||Tokyo, Japan|| KO (3 Knockdowns/Right cross) || 1 || 2:01
|- style="background:#CCFFCC;"
| 2019-08-18||  Win|| align="left" | Shunta ||K.O CLIMAX 2019 SUMMER KICK FEVER ||Tokyo, Japan|| KO (Punches) || 5 || 1:18
|- style="background:#CCFFCC;"
| 2019-06-09||Win  || align="left" | Shogo Kuriaki ||REBELS.61 ||Tokyo, Japan|| Decision (Unanimous) || 5 || 3:00
|-
! style=background:white colspan=9 |
|- style="background:#CCFFCC;"
| 2019-04-20||Win  || align="left" | Hannya Hashimoto ||REBELS.60 ||Tokyo, Japan|| Decision (Unanimous) || 3 || 3:00
|- style="background:#FFBBBB;"
| 2019-02-11||Loss || align="left" | Seiki Ueyama ||SHOOT BOXING 2019 act.1 ||Tokyo, Japan|| Decision (Majority) || 3 || 3:00
|- style="background:#CCFFCC;"
| 2018-12-16||Win  || align="left" | Kazuto  ||Japan Kickboxing Innovation ||Tokyo, Japan|| KO (Left Hook to the Body) || 3 || 1:12
|-
! style=background:white colspan=9 |
|- style="background:#c5d2ea;"
| 2018-08-03||Draw || align="left" | Dawsakorn Mor.Tasanai ||REBELS.57 ||Tokyo, Japan|| Ext.R Decision  ||4 || 3:00
|- style="background:#CCFFCC;"
| 2018-04-27||Win  || align="left" | Yuudai Hamamoto ||REBELS.55 ||Tokyo, Japan|| TKO (Three knockdowns)  || 2 || 1:50
|- style="background:#CCFFCC;"
| 2017-12-17||Win  || align="left" | Takahiro Sakuragi ||Japan Kickboxing Innovation Champions Carnival 2017  ||Tokyo, Japan|| Decision (Unanimous) || 3 || 3:00
|- style="background:#CCFFCC;"
| 2017-10-18||Win  || align="left" | Lampoochai Kaewsamrit ||Japan Kickboxing Innovation ||Okayama, Japan|| Decision (Unanimous) || 3 || 3:00
|- style="background:#CCFFCC;"
| 2017-09-15||Win  || align="left" | Yugo Flyskygym ||RISE 119  ||Tokyo, Japan|| TKO (Body shots) || 2 || 2:09
|- style="background:#c5d2ea;"
| 2017-07-20||Draw  || align="left" | Yuya Kosaka ||ROAD TO KNOCK OUT.2  ||Tokyo, Japan|| Decision (Unanimous) || 3 || 3:00
|- style="background:#CCFFCC;"
| 2017-06-11||Win  || align="left" | Kiminori Matsuzaki ||REBELS.51 ||Tokyo, Japan|| Decision (Unanimous) || 5 || 3:00
|-
! style=background:white colspan=9 |
|- style="background:#CCFFCC;"
| 2017-03-11||Win  || align="left" | Kazuya Okuwaki ||REBELS.49 ||Tokyo, Japan|| Decision (Unanimous) || 3 || 3:00
|- style="background:#CCFFCC;"
| 2017-01-22||Win  || align="left" | Takuya Hasunuma ||REBELS.48 & INNOVATION Champions Carnival ||Tokyo, Japan|| Decision (Unanimous)|| 3 || 3:00
|- style="background:#CCFFCC;"
| 2016-10-09||Win  || align="left" | Ryuta ||Japan Kickboxing Innovation  ||Okayama, Japan|| Decision (Unanimous)|| 3 || 3:00
|- style="background:#CCFFCC;"
| 2016-08-07||Win  || align="left" | Taiga Nakayama ||Kunlun Fight 49 / Rebels 45 ||Tokyo, Japan|| Decision (Unanimous) || 3 || 3:00
|- style="background:#CCFFCC;"
| 2016-06-01||Win  || align="left" | Kim Seung Min ||REBELS.43 ||Tokyo, Japan|| KO (Spinning Back Fist)|| 1 || 1:15
|-
| colspan=9 | Legend:    

|- style="background:#CCFFCC;"
| 2016-04-29||Win  || align="left" | Keito Akiyama|| JAKF SMASHERS 179 ||Tokyo, Japan|| TKO || 2 || 1:58

|- style="background:#CCFFCC;"
| 2016-03-27||Win  || align="left" | Koudai Kanamitsu ||K-1 Amateur, Final ||Tokyo, Japan|| Decision (Unanimous) || 2 || 3:00

|- style="background:#CCFFCC;"
| 2016-03-27||Win  || align="left" | Naoya Otada ||K-1 Amateur, Semi Final ||Tokyo, Japan|| Decision (Majority) || 2 || 3:00

|- style="background:#CCFFCC;"
| 2016-03-20||Win  || align="left" | Teshima || JAKF SMASHERS 178 ||Tokyo, Japan|| Decision (Unanimous) ||  ||

|- style="background:#CCFFCC;"
| 2016-02-14||Win  || align="left" | Kazuya Kato ||K-1 Challenge A-Class -55 kg Tournament, Final ||Tokyo, Japan|| KO ||  ||

|- style="background:#CCFFCC;"
| 2016-02-14||Win  || align="left" | Yusei Sakurai ||K-1 Challenge A-Class -55 kg Tournament, Semi Final ||Tokyo, Japan|| Decision (Majority) || 2 || 3:00

|-  style="background:#cfc;"
| 2015-08-30|| Win || align=left| Kyosuke Yamaguchi || 1st WBC Muay Thai Jr League, All Japan Tournament Final|| Tokyo, Japan || Decision || ||
|-
! style=background:white colspan=9 |

|-  style="background:#cfc;"
| 2015-08-30|| Win || align=left| Aoshi Kitano || 1st WBC Muay Thai Jr League, All Japan Tournament Semi Final|| Tokyo, Japan || Decision || ||

|-  style="background:#cfc;"
| 2015-08-02|| Win || align=left| Kohei Watanabe || Muay Thai Super Fight Amateur vol.2 - Suk Wan Kingtong|| Tokyo, Japan || Decision (Unanimous) || 2 || 2:00

|-  style="background:#cfc;"
| 2015-08-02|| Win || align=left| Michitaka Yamaguchi || Muay Thai Super Fight Amateur vol.2 - Suk Wan Kingtong|| Tokyo, Japan || Decision (Unanimous) || 2 || 2:00

|-  style="background:#cfc;"
| 2015-07-19|| Win || align=left| Kyosuke Yamaguchi || SMASHERS 175|| Tokyo, Japan || Decision  ||  || 
|-
! style=background:white colspan=9 |

|-  style="background:#cfc;"
| 2015-06-14|| Win||align=left| Yuuki Miyoshi || JAKF SMASHERS 174 || Tokyo, Japan || Decision (Unanimous)|| 2 || 1:30

|-  style="background:#cfc;"
| 2015-03-22|| Win||align=left| Hidenojou Shimizu || JAKF SMASHERS 170 || Tokyo, Japan || Decision || 2 || 1:30 
|-
! style=background:white colspan=9 |

|-  style="background:#cfc;"
| 2015-03-15|| Win||align=left| Yuya Hayashi || 4th All Japan Jr. Kick -45 kg, Final || Tokyo, Japan || Decision ||  || 
|-
! style=background:white colspan=9 |

|-  style="background:#cfc;"
| 2015-03-15|| Win||align=left|  || 4th All Japan Jr. Kick -45 kg, Semi Final || Tokyo, Japan || Decision ||  ||

|-  style="background:#cfc;"
| 2015-03-15|| Win||align=left|  || 4th All Japan Jr. Kick -45 kg, Quarter Final || Tokyo, Japan || Decision ||  ||

|-  style="background:#fbb;"
| 2014-12-21|| Loss||align=left| Haruto Abe|| Windy Sports Tournament, Semi Final|| Tokyo, Japan ||  Decision  ||  ||

|-  style="background:#cfc;"
| 2014-12-13|| Win ||align=left| Ryutaro Uchida|| JAKF SMASHERS Tournament || Tokyo, Japan ||  Decision  || 2 || 1:30

|-  style="background:#cfc;"
| 2014-11-30 || Win||align=left| Hayate || TENKAICHI Fight || Tokyo, Japan || Decision (Unanimous)|| 3 || 2:00

|-  style="background:#cfc;"
| 2014-10-19 || Win ||align=left| Madoki Tanaka || BOM Amateur 8||  Yokohama, Japan ||Decision || 2 || 2:00

|-  style="background:#cfc;"
| 2014-10-13|| Win ||align=left| Kyo Kawakami || MUAYTHAI WINDY SUPER FIGHT vol.18 in KYOTO || Kyoto, Japan ||  Decision (Unanimous)  || 2 || 2:00

|-  style="background:#cfc;"
| 2014-10-05 || Win ||align=left| Rikusho Kabe || MuayThaiOpen 28||  Yokohama, Japan ||KO||  || 
|-
! style=background:white colspan=9 |

|-  style="background:#cfc;"
| 2014-09-21|| Win ||align=left| Shino Ishibashi|| JAKF SMASHERS 167 || Tokyo, Japan ||  Decision (Unanimous)  || 2 || 1:30

|- style="background:#c5d2ea;"
| 2014-08-31||Draw|| align="left" | Aito Sasaki ||Japan Kickboxing INNOVATION ||Tokyo, Japan|| Decision || 2 || 2:00

|- style="background:#FFBBBB;"
| 2014-08-17||Loss || align="left" | Koki Osaki ||MUAYTHAI WINDY SUPER FIGHT vol.17 ||Tokyo, Japan|| Decision (Unanimous) || 3 || 2:00

|- style="background:#CCFFCC;"
| 2014-06-29||Win || align="left" | Riichi Hoshino ||Muay Thai WINDY Super Fight vol.16, Final ||Tokyo, Japan|| Decision (Unanimous) || 5 || 1:00 
|-
! style=background:white colspan=9 |

|- style="background:#CCFFCC;"
| 2014-06-29||Win || align="left" | Ryutaro Uchida ||Muay Thai WINDY Super Fight vol.16, Semi Final ||Tokyo, Japan|| Decision (Split) || 2 || 1:30

|- style="background:#CCFFCC;"
| 2014-06-29||Win || align="left" | Shinnosuke Hatsuda ||Muay Thai WINDY Super Fight vol.16, Quarter Final ||Tokyo, Japan|| Decision  ||  ||

|- style="background:#CCFFCC;"
| 2014-06-29||Win || align="left" | Retsu Akabane ||Muay Thai WINDY Super Fight vol.16, First Round ||Tokyo, Japan|| Decision  ||  ||

|-  style="background:#cfc;"
| 2014-06-01 || Win||align=left| Kou Sugita|| JAKF SMASHERS 165 ||  Tokyo, Japan ||Decision (Unanimous) || 2 || 1:30

|-  style="background:#cfc;"
| 2014-05-06 || Win||align=left| Toki Tamaru || The Battle of Muay Thai Amateur 6, -40 kg Championship League ||  Tokyo, Japan ||Decision || 2 || 2:00
|-
! style=background:white colspan=9 |

|-  style="background:#cfc;"
| 2014-05-06 || Win||align=left| Taison Suzuki || The Battle of Muay Thai Amateur 6, -40 kg Championship League ||  Tokyo, Japan ||Decision || 2 || 2:00

|-  style="background:#cfc;"
| 2014-05-06 || Win||align=left| Retsu Akabane || The Battle of Muay Thai Amateur 6, -40 kg Championship League ||  Tokyo, Japan ||Decision || 2 || 2:00

|-  style="background:#cfc;"
| 2014-03-30|| Win||align=left| Kaito Sakaguchi || 3rd All Japan Jr. Kick -40 kg, Final || Tokyo, Japan || Decision ||  || 
|-
! style=background:white colspan=9 |

|-  style="background:#cfc;"
| 2014-03-30|| Win||align=left|  || 3rd All Japan Jr. Kick -40 kg, Semi Final || Tokyo, Japan || Decision ||  ||

|-  style="background:#cfc;"
| 2014-03-30|| Win||align=left|  || 3rd All Japan Jr. Kick -40 kg, Quarter Final || Tokyo, Japan || Decision ||  ||

|-  style="background:#cfc;"
| 2014-03-23|| Win ||align=left| Ryuta Inoue || JAKF SMASHERS 163 || Tokyo, Japan ||  KO  || 2 ||

|-  style="background:#CCFFCC;"
| 2014-03-16||Win ||align=left| Toki Tamaru || REBELS.25 || Tokyo, Japan ||  Decision || 2 || 2:00

|-  style="background:#CCFFCC;"
| 2014-02-11||Win ||align=left| Jukiya Itō || REBELS Amateur BLOW-CUP 24,  Final || Tokyo, Japan ||  Decision || 1 || 2:00

|-  style="background:#CCFFCC;"
| 2014-02-11||Win||align=left| Yuya Hayashi || REBELS Amateur BLOW-CUP 24, Semi Final || Tokyo, Japan ||  Decision || 1 || 3:00

|- style="background:#CCFFCC;"
| 2013-12-02||Win || align="left" | Jun Sakuma ||6th Kokusai Junior Kickboxing||Japan|| Decision  ||  ||

|- style="background:#FFBBBB;"
| 2013-11-16||Loss || align="left" | Kaito Sakaguchi ||SHOOT BOXING GROUND ZERO TOKYO 2013||Tokyo, Japan|| Decision (Majority) || 2 || 2:00
|-
! style=background:white colspan=9 |

|- style="background:#CCFFCC;"
| 2013-11-03||Win || align="left" | Jinnojou Shimizu ||JAKF Amateur||Tokyo, Japan|| Decision (Majority) || 2 || 1:30

|- style="background:#CCFFCC;"
| 2013-10-13||Win || align="left" | Kotaro Yamada ||Amateur Shootboxing ||Tokyo, Japan|| Decision ||  ||

|- style="background:#CCFFCC;"
| 2013-10-06|| Win || align="left" | Ikko Oota ||Blizzard Gym - Muay Thai - Samak Len 4||Tokyo, Japan|| Decision  || 3 ||2:00
|-
! style=background:white colspan=9 |

|- style="background:#FFBBBB;"
| 2013-09-08||Loss || align="left" | Yuuta Sasaki ||Battle of Muay Thai Amateur, Final ||Tokyo, Japan|| Decision || 2 || 2:00

|- style="background:#CCFFCC;"
| 2013-09-08||Win || align="left" | Kaisei Yamada ||Battle of Muay Thai Amateur, Semi Final ||Tokyo, Japan|| Decision || 2 || 2:00

|- style="background:#CCFFCC;"
| 2013-09-08||Win || align="left" | Raito Tamagawa ||Battle of Muay Thai Amateur, Quarter Final ||Tokyo, Japan|| Decision || 2 || 2:00

|- style="background:#cfc;"
| 2013-08-11||Win|| align="left" | Riichi Hoshino ||Muay Thai WINDY Super Fight vol.14, Final ||Tokyo, Japan|| Decision || 5 || 1:30
|-
! style=background:white colspan=9 |

|- style="background:#cfc;"
| 2013-08-11||Win|| align="left" | ||Muay Thai WINDY Super Fight vol.14, Semi Final ||Tokyo, Japan|| Decision ||  ||

|- style="background:#CCFFCC;"
| 2013-06-30||Win || align="left" | Ikkō Oota ||NJKF Muay Thai Open 23 ||Tokyo, Japan|| Decision (Unanimous)|| 2 || 3:00

|- style="background:#FFBBBB;"
| 2013-05-12||Loss || align="left" | Ruka Tagawa ||DEEP☆KICK 15 ||Osaka, Japan|| Decision (Unanimous)|| 2 || 3:00
|-
! style=background:white colspan=9 |

|- style="background:#CCFFCC;"
| 2013-05-06||Win || align="left" | Jukiya Itō ||REBELS Amateur BLOW-CUP 16 ||Tokyo, Japan|| Decision (Unanimous)|| 2 || 2:00

|- style="background:#FFBBBB;"
| 2013-03-31||Loss || align="left" | Takasuke Sekimto ||All Japan Jr Kick, Semi Final ||Tokyo, Japan|| Decision ||  ||

|- style="background:#CCFFCC;"
| 2013-03-31||Win || align="left" |  ||All Japan Jr Kick, Quarter Final ||Tokyo, Japan|| Decision || ||

|-  style="background:#CCFFCC;"
| 2013-03-17||Win ||align=left| Toki Tamaru || MA Kick BREAK-35 || Tokyo, Japan ||  Decision || 3 || 1:30
|-
! style=background:white colspan=9 |

|- style="background:#CCFFCC;"
| 2013-03-03||Win || align="left" | Jukiya Itō ||REBELS Amateur BLOW-CUP 14 ||Tokyo, Japan|| Ex.R Decision (Unanimous)|| 3 || 2:00

|- style="background:#CCFFCC;"
| 2013-02-03||Win || align="left" | Retsu Akabane ||REBELS Amateur BLOW-CUP 13 ||Tokyo, Japan|| Decision (Unanimous)|| 2 || 2:00

|- style="background:#cfc;"
| 2012-11-18||Win || align="left" | REIYA ||MA Japan Kick 2012 -FINAL-||Tokyo, Japan|| KO || 2 ||

|- style="background:#CCFFCC;"
| 2012-10-21|| Win || align="left" | Ryutaro Uchida ||Muay Thai Open 22||Tokyo, Japan|| Decision  || 3 || 1:30
|-
! style=background:white colspan=9 |

|-  style="background:#CCFFCC;"
| 2012-08-05 || Win ||align=left| Ryuya Okuwaki || Muay Yoko 19 || Tokyo, Japan || Decision || 2 || 2:00

|- style="background:#CCFFCC;"
| 2012-06-10 || Win || align="left" | Ikko Oota||Muay Thai WINDY Super Fight vol.12||Tokyo, Japan|| Decision  ||  || 
|-
! style=background:white colspan=9 |

|- style="background:#CCFFCC;"
| 2012-05-26|| Win || align="left" | Ryuya Koyama||Muay Thai Open 20||Tokyo, Japan|| Decision (Split) || 3 || 1:30
|-
! style=background:white colspan=9 |

|- style="background:#CCFFCC;"
| 2012-05-06|| Win || align="left" | REIYA ||MA Japan Kick BREAK-25 - CANNONBALL||Tokyo, Japan|| Decision (Unanimous) || 3 || 1:30
|-
! style=background:white colspan=9 |

|- style="background:#CCFFCC;"
| 2012-04-15|| Win || align="left" | Naito Harada ||All Japan Jr Kick, Final||Tokyo, Japan|| Decision || 3 || 2:00 
|-
! style=background:white colspan=9 |

|- style="background:#CCFFCC;"
| 2012-04-15|| Win || align="left" | ||All Japan Jr Kick, Semi Final||Tokyo, Japan|| Decision || 2 || 2:00

|- style="background:#CCFFCC;"
| 2012-04-15|| Win || align="left" | ||All Japan Jr Kick, Quarter Final||Tokyo, Japan|| Decision || 2 ||2:00

|- style="background:#CCFFCC;"
| 2012-03-04|| Win || align="left" | Tōma Sugihara ||All Japan Jr Kick Kanto Selection, Final||Tokyo, Japan|| Decision || 3 || 2:00

|- style="background:#CCFFCC;"
| 2012-03-04|| Win || align="left" | Naito Harada ||All Japan Jr Kick Kanto Selection, Semi Final||Tokyo, Japan|| Decision || 2 || 2:00

|- style="background:#CCFFCC;"
| 2012-03-04|| Win || align="left" | Rei Yamamoto ||All Japan Jr Kick Kanto Selection, Quarter Final||Tokyo, Japan|| Decision|| 2 || 2:00

|- style="background:#FFBBBB;"
| 2012-01-29|| Loss|| align="left" | Naito Harada ||M-1 Amateur Event, Semi Final||Chiba Prefecture, Japan||Decision || 2 || 2:00

|- style="background:#CCFFCC;"
| 2012-01-29|| Win || align="left" | Ryuusei Kashiwagi ||M-1 Amateur Event, Quarter Final||Chiba Prefecture, Japan|| Decision || 2 || 2:00

|- style="background:#CCFFCC;"
| 2011-08-07|| Win || align="left" | Kippei Niina ||Muay Lok 2011 3rd||Tokyo, Japan|| Decision (Unanimous)|| 2 ||2:00

|- style="background:#CCFFCC;"
| 2011-07-18|| Win || align="left" | Kan Kikuchi ||MA Japan Kick BREAK-16 - GRASP||Tokyo, Japan|| Decision|| 3 ||1:30 
|-
! style=background:white colspan=9 |

|- style="background:#CCFFCC;"
| 2011-06-05|| Win || align="left" | Naoto Fukuda ||Muay Yoko 15||Tokyo, Japan|| Decision||  ||

|- style="background:#CCFFCC;"
| 2011-04-24|| Win || align="left" | Naito Harada ||MA Japan Kick BREAK-12 -It starts-||Tokyo, Japan|| Decision|| 3 || 1:30
|-
! style=background:white colspan=9 |

|- style="background:#CCFFCC;"
| 2011-04-17|| Win || align="left" | Ryunosuke Suzuki ||MA Kick Amateur 135||Tokyo, Japan|| Decision|| 2 || 1:30

|- style="background:#CCFFCC;"
| 2010-11-07|| Win || align="left" | Shogo Nakajima||Muay Thai WINDY Super Fight vol.5 2010 FINAL||Tokyo, Japan|| Decision||  ||
|-
! style=background:white colspan=9 |

|- style="background:#CCFFCC;"
| 2010-10-10|| Win || align="left" | Shogo Gokan ||MANihon Kick BREAK-6 ||Tokyo, Japan|| Decision|| 2 || 1:30

|- style="background:#CCFFCC;"
| 2010-09-19|| Win || align="left" | Riku Oonishi ||Muay Thai WINDY Super Fight vol.4||Tokyo, Japan|| Decision||  ||
|-
! style=background:white colspan=9 |

|- style="background:#CCFFCC;"
| 2010-08-29|| Win || align="left" | Naito Harada ||M-1 Muay Thai Amateur 36 - M-1 Kid's CHAMPION CARNIVAL 2010 2nd||Tokyo, Japan|| Decision (Majority)|| 3 ||
|-
! style=background:white colspan=9 |

|- style="background:#CCFFCC;"
| 2010-03-28|| Win || align="left" | Riku Oonishi ||M-1 Muay Thai Amateur 33 - M-1 Kid's CHAMPION CARNIVAL 2010||Tokyo, Japan|| Decision (Unanimous)|| 3 ||
|-
! style=background:white colspan=9 |

|- style="background:#CCFFCC;"
| 2010-02-28|| Win || align="left" | Naito Harada ||M-1 Muay Thai Amateur 32||Tokyo, Japan|| Decision||  ||

|- style="background:#c5d2ea;"
| 2010-01-17|| Draw|| align="left" | Riku Oonishi ||Muay Lok Junior 1 ||Tokyo, Japan|| Decision||  ||
|-
| colspan=9 | Legend''':

See also
 List of male kickboxers

References

2000 births
Living people
Japanese male kickboxers
Sportspeople from Tokyo